The Quarter Sessions Act 1837 (1 & 2 Vict. c. 4) was an Act of Parliament in the United Kingdom, signed into law on 23 December 1837. In order to remove doubts which existed on the subject, it enacted that juries could be summoned to attend adjourned quarter sessions.

References
The British almanac of the Society for the Diffusion of Useful Knowledge, for the year 1839. The Society for the Diffusion of Useful Knowledge, London, 1839.

1837 in British law
United Kingdom Acts of Parliament 1837